German submarine U-248 was a Type VIIC U-boat of Nazi Germany's Kriegsmarine during World War II. The submarine was laid down on 19 December 1942 at the Friedrich Krupp Germaniawerft yard at Kiel as yard number 682, launched on 7 October 1943 and commissioned on 6 November under the command of Oberleutnant zur See Bernhard Emde.

In two patrols, she sank or damaged no ships.

She was sunk in mid-Atlantic by US warships on 16 January 1945.

Design
German Type VIIC submarines were preceded by the shorter Type VIIB submarines. U-248 had a displacement of  when at the surface and  while submerged. She had two shafts and two  propellers.

U-248 was fitted with five  torpedo tubes (four fitted at the bow and one at the stern), fourteen torpedoes, one  SK C/35 naval gun, (220 rounds), one  Flak M42 and two twin  C/30 anti-aircraft guns. The boat had a complement of between forty-four and sixty.

Service history
After training with the 5th U-boat Flotilla at Kiel, U-248 was transferred to the 9th flotilla for front-line service on 1 August 1944. She was reassigned to the 11th flotilla on 1 November.

First patrol
The boat's first patrol was preceded by two short trips between Kiel in Germany and Horten Naval Base and Bergen, both in Norway. Her first sortie began with her departure from Bergen on 18 August 1944. She arrived at Trondheim on 14 October.

Second patrol and loss
Forty-seven men died; there were no survivors.

References

Bibliography

External links

World War II submarines of Germany
German Type VIIC submarines
U-boats commissioned in 1943
1943 ships
U-boats sunk in 1945
U-boats sunk by depth charges
U-boats sunk by US warships
Ships built in Kiel
Ships lost with all hands
Maritime incidents in January 1945